Jointure is, in law, a provision for a wife after the death of her husband. As defined by Sir Edward Coke, it is "a competent livelihood of freehold for the wife, of lands or tenements, to take effect presently in possession or profit after the death of her husband for the life of the wife at least, if she herself be not the cause of determination or forfeiture of it': (Co. Litt. 36b).

Legal definition

A jointure is of two kinds, legal and equitable. A legal jointure was first authorized by the 1536 Statute of Uses. Before this statute a husband had no legal seisin in such lands as were vested in another to his "use", but merely an equitable estate. Consequently, it was usual to make settlements on marriage, the most general form being the settlement by deed of an estate to the use of the husband and wife for their lives in joint tenancy (or "jointure") so that the whole would go to the survivor. Although, strictly speaking, a jointure is a joint estate limited to both husband and wife, in common acceptation the word extends also to a sole estate limited to the wife only.

Requisites
The requisites of a legal jointure are:
 the jointure must take effect immediately after the husband's death;
 it must be for the wife's life or for a greater estate, or be determinable by her own act;
it must be made before marriage; if after, it is voidable at the wife's election, on the death of the husband;
it must be expressed to be in satisfaction of dower and not of part of it.

In equity, any provision made for a wife before marriage and accepted by her (not being an infant) in lieu of dower was a bar to such. If the provision was made after marriage, the wife was not barred by such provision, though expressly stated to be in lieu of dower; she was put to her election between jointure and dower.

After marriage, a wife could bar her right to dower by a fine being levied.  This meant that in practice, jointures could also be created by a post-nuptial settlement, provided the wife was willing.  Wives (or their relatives on their behalf) often paid their husband a lump sum (known as a portion) or otherwise handed over her property to him, in exchange for a jointure (usually being more than a third) being settled on her for life.  This might (in practice) be in the form of a share of the whole property or the right to a particular part of it or an annuity from it.

See also
Curtesy
Elective share

References

Common law legal terminology
Marriage
Property law
English legal terminology